Tepebaşı is a village in Karaman Province, Turkey.

It is located on a  - high hill in a valley. Its population was 513 as of 2009.

Tepebaşı is an old village. Its name was Bednam during the Byzantine Empire era. It was captured by a certain Halimi Bey during the Karaman Beylik era. During the Ottoman era it was renamed Halimiye and during the Turkish Republic it was renamed Tepebaşı (literally "top of the hill")

References

Villages in Ermenek District